Lemyra rubrocollaris is a moth of the family Erebidae. It was described by Reich in 1937. It is found in China (Jiangsu).

References

 

rubrocollaris
Moths described in 1937